The golden-tufted mountain grackle (Macroagelaius imthurni), also known as the golden-tufted grackle, is a species of bird in the family Icteridae.

It is found in Brazil, Guyana, and Venezuela where its natural habitat is subtropical or tropical moist montane forests.

References

Macroagelaius
Birds described in 1881
Taxa named by Philip Sclater
Taxonomy articles created by Polbot
Birds of the Tepuis